Takayuki Mae (前 貴之, born September 16, 1993) also known as Chamaesama, is a Japanese football player for Renofa Yamaguchi FC, and a Bakery Owner.

His younger brother Hiroyuki is also a professional footballer currently playing for J1 League side Avispa Fukuoka.

Club statistics
Updated to 1 January 2020.

References

External links
Profile at Renofa Yamaguchi FC

1993 births
Living people
Association football people from Hokkaido
Japanese footballers
J1 League players
J2 League players
J3 League players
Hokkaido Consadole Sapporo players
Kataller Toyama players
J.League U-22 Selection players
Renofa Yamaguchi FC players
Yokohama F. Marinos players
Matsumoto Yamaga FC players
Association football defenders
Sportspeople from Sapporo